The Maxwell Street Bridge is a historic bridge in De Witt, Arkansas. Built c. 1910, it carries West Maxwell Avenue over a small creek, between Adams and Jefferson Streets. It consists of a single spans of steel girders, resting on concrete abutments with diagonal wing walls, and is covered with concrete decking that has an asphalt road surface. Its guard rails consist of poured concrete panels, with incised rectangles on the side. Maxwell Avenue was originally the northernmost boundary of De Witt's street grid.

The bridge was listed on the National Register of Historic Places in 2011.

See also
North Washington Street Bridge
North Jackson Street Bridge
National Register of Historic Places listings in Arkansas County, Arkansas
List of bridges on the National Register of Historic Places in Arkansas

References

Road bridges on the National Register of Historic Places in Arkansas
Bridges completed in 1910
National Register of Historic Places in Arkansas County, Arkansas
Steel bridges in the United States
Girder bridges in the United States
1910 establishments in Arkansas
Transportation in Arkansas County, Arkansas
DeWitt, Arkansas